Thinking and Destiny by Harold W. Percival on "The law of thought". Its basic premise is that thinking creates karma or destiny. The book shows how to perfect our thinking and learn how to think without creating thoughts.

Ideas
The book is based on what Percival called “The law of thought.” It was produced over a period of 34 years and has 14 chapters, each with sections. Percival also provides succinct definitions of many words, from Accident and Alcoholism to Wrong, as they are used in his book. In Thinking and Destiny he offers a complete cosmology of the universe, with ideas such as the universe having nature and intelligent sides. Percival defines the nature side of the universe, in part, as an unintelligent mechanism through which units that are conscious only as their functions become self-conscious intelligences by means of what he termed “The Eternal Order of Progression.”

The Law of Thought
In Thinking and Destiny, Percival explains how all of life’s lessons are the result of our own thinking and can be used to learn what to do and what not to do, and that we can perfect our thinking and learn how to think without creating thoughts. Thinking without creating thoughts is said to be the way to stop creating karma or destiny. Thinking is shown to be the cause and solution to reincarnation, otherwise known as the wheel of birth, life and death. Percival leaves it to the reader to choose what to do with the often startling information provided and assures that the lessons will be learned eventually.

Conscious of Consciousness
In his foreword to the book, the author explained that his experiences of being “conscious of Consciousness” allowed him to focus the Conscious Light within on subjects to see their essence. He further stated that the book was dictated because it was difficult to do this kind of thinking and write at the same time. While the contents of Thinking and Destiny are from no other book or body of authority, he indicated that the authority for the truth in the book is in the reader who can judge the statements by the truth that is in him or her. To be able to think in this concentrated way and to be “conscious of Consciousness” are shown to be potentially within the grasp of all humans.

The Great Way
In a postscript to Thinking and Destiny it is stated that the most one person can do for another is to tell him or her that there is the Great Way, as shown in the book. The Great Way is how and where the human body is transformed into an immortal body. The author offers specific information for the few who really want it, and shows why each person must do the work in life, not after death. The individual will embrace the ideas or put them off, but death remains the cost of life until conscious immortality is attained. The truth is faced as a matter of honesty and courage.

The Word Foundation
In 1950 Harold W. Percival established The Word Foundation, Inc., a non-profit organization, to keep Thinking and Destiny and all of his other works in print and to share with the people of the world what he called “the royal good news” about the doer said to be indwelling in every human body. Three of his other books expanded on themes from Thinking and Destiny. They are: Man and Woman and Child, Democracy Is Self-Government, and Masonry and Its Symbols.

Contents
 Introduction
 The Purpose and Plan of the Universe
 Objections to the Law of Thought
 Operation of the Law of Thought
 Physical Destiny
 Psychic Destiny
 Mental Destiny
 Noetic Destiny
 Re-existence
 Gods and their Religions
 The Great Way
 The Point or Circle
 The Circle or Zodiac
 Thinking: the Way to Conscious Immortality

Editions
Thinking and Destiny, by Harold W. Percival, was originally published by The Word Publishing Company, New York in 1946 and is now in its fourteenth printing. Its subtitle is: “With a Brief Account of the Descent of Man into this Human World, and, How He Will Return to the Eternal Order of Progression.” To support the text, Percival included sections for Symbols, Illustrations and Charts and Definitions of Terms and Phrases as they are used in the book.

Influence
Percival’s works were noted as a major influence upon Richard Matheson, the famous author and screenwriter. He said that his book The Path was based largely on Thinking and Destiny.

In the book, The Bhagavad Gita: The Song of the Exalted Self, 1999, by Owen Slight, the author states that Harold W. Percival’s Thinking and Destiny, like the Bhagavad Gita, reveals relevant, instructive and long lasting lessons regarding the higher self and the human plight—long lost lessons of everlasting truth contained both in the Sanskrit Bhagavad Gita and Thinking and Destiny. Both books contain complete systems of knowledge. The plight of Arjuna is shown by Percival to be our own.

References

Further reading
 Percival, Harold W., Thinking and Destiny, The Word Foundation, Inc. Fourteenth Printing, 2010

External links 

 The Word Foundation

New Age literature